McDavid is a surname. Notable people with the surname include:

Connor McDavid, Canadian ice hockey player
Eric McDavid, American green anarchist
Raven I. McDavid, Jr., American linguist
Ray McDavid, American baseball player

See also
17185 Mcdavid, main-belt asteroid
McDavid, Florida, unincorporated community
Murray McDavid, Scotch whisky bottling company
MacDavid, an Israeli hamburger restaurant chain

Scottish surnames
Patronymic surnames
Surnames from given names